Rio is a hamlet in the province of Rieti, in the Lazio region of Italy. It is a frazione of the comune of Amatrice (which is roughly 6 km away).

History
On 24 August 2016, Rio was severely damaged, with 90 percent of its buildings destroyed, as a result of the 2016 Amatrice earthquake.

Main sights
Oratory of Santa Maria di Loreto (late 16th century), built by Orsini family, Amatrice's feudatories.

References

External links

 Official Website of Amatrice

Rieti